Shahidi Hassas District (also called Caher Cineh - pronounced char chineh) is a district of Uruzgan Province, Afghanistan.

Government 
Since 2006 government presence has gradually been reduced to a radius of five km around the district centre.  In the Tagab area there has been no government presence at all since 2006.

References

External links 
 Map of Settlements United Nations, AIMS, May 2002

Districts of Urozgan Province